Jeffrey Olver (born 25 December 1960) is an Australian former football (soccer) player. Olver is a member of the Football Federation Australia - Football Hall of Fame.

Playing career

Club career
Olver played for Heidelberg and Melbourne Croatia in the Australian National Soccer League.

International career
Olver played 37 times for Australia. He was part of the Australian team that made the Quarter Final of the 1988 Olympic Football Tournament.

He played for Australia in the 1989 FIFA Futsal World Championship finals.

Olver is often regarded as one of the greatest goalkeepers Australia has ever produced

Coaching career
In 1995 Olver coached Bulleen Lions in the Victorian Premier League. He later coached Carlton's youth team in the National Soccer League National Youth League. In 2000, he rejoined Heidelberg.

References

1960 births
Living people
Futsal goalkeepers
Australian soccer players
Australian men's futsal players
Australia international soccer players
Australia B international soccer players
National Soccer League (Australia) players
Melbourne Knights FC players
Olympic soccer players of Australia
Footballers at the 1988 Summer Olympics
Association football goalkeepers